1982 in philosophy

Events

Publications 
 J. L. Mackie, The Miracle of Theism: Arguments for and against the Existence of God (1982)
 Carol Gilligan, In a Different Voice (1982)
 Tzvetan Todorov, The Conquest of America: The Question of the Other (1982)
 Michael Sandel, Liberalism and the Limits of Justice (1982)

Births 

 September 24th - Neil McDonnell,Scottish philosopher
 September 25th - Jennifer Corns, Glasgow-based philosopher working on pain.

Deaths 
 February 21 - Gershom Scholem (born 1897)
 March 2 - Philip K. Dick (born 1928)
 March 6 - Ayn Rand (born 1905)  
 June 26 - Alexander Mitscherlich (born 1908)
 October 9 - Anna Freud (born 1895)
 November 19 - Erving Goffman (born 1922)

References 

Philosophy
20th-century philosophy
Philosophy by year